George Harold Baker  (November 4, 1877 – June 2, 1916) was a lawyer, political figure, and soldier from Quebec, Canada. He represented Brome in the House of Commons of Canada from 1911 to 1916 as a Conservative Member of Parliament.

He is the only sitting Canadian MP to be killed in action on military service.  Fellow MP Samuel Simpson Sharpe also served at the front, was wounded and died by suicide in 1918 while on convalescent leave in Canada.

Early life
He was born in Sweetsburg, Quebec, the son of George Barnard Baker, a member of parliament and Senator. He studied at Bishop's College School from 1889 to 1893.

Prior to the First World War, Baker served as a member of the 6th Duke of Connaught’s Royal Canadian Hussars and the 13th Scottish Light Dragoons.

Political career
Baker was elected as the Member of Parliament for Brome in the 1911 federal election, representing the Conservative Party.

First World War
Baker fought in World War I as a Lieutenant-Colonel, commanding the 5th Canadian Mounted Rifles. He was killed in action at Wieltje Salient, West Flanders, Belgium on June 2, 1916, during the Battle of Mount Sorrel. Baker was carried out of the action by his second-in-command Major Dennis Draper. He was buried at Poperinghe New Military Cemetery, where his gravestone bears the inscription: DEATH IS A LOW MIST WHICH CANNOT BLOT THE BRIGHTNESS IT MAY VEIL.

Baker's life and death were commemorated by the publication of A Canadian Soldier (1917). A memorial service was held at Christ Church in Sweetsburg, Quebec, on June 18, 1916. Tributes were paid by the Reverend W. P. R. Lewis and General Sir Sam Hughes, Minister of Militia. Baker's death was also marked by the Prime Minister of Canada Sir Robert Borden, with a statement published in the press and a further tribute given at the opening of parliament on January 18, 1917.

A bronze memorial statue to Baker by R. Tait McKenzie was unveiled on February 29, 1924, by Governor General Lord Byng in the House of Commons foyer in the Centre Block building of the Parliament of Canada in Ottawa, Canada. The Prime Minister of Canada William Lyon MacKenzie King spoke at the unveiling, and his speech and those of others were recorded in the red leather-bound commemorative volume Parliamentary Memoir of George Harold Baker, M.P. (1924). This volume also included a funerary poem for Baker: "Non Mortuus".

The base of the memorial statue bears the following inscription: 

Either side of the recess holding the memorial statue, there are inscriptions on the walls. The inscription to the left is a biblical quote (2 Maccabees 6.31) and the inscription to the right is the final five lines of the poem "In Flanders Fields" by John McCrae.

Electoral record

References

External links 

A Canadian soldier: George Harold Baker, M.P. (1917) by J. W. Cunliffe
The Immortalized (Colonels of the Canadian Expeditionary Force)
George Harold Baker's military service record (Library and Archives Canada) 
George Harold Baker (Canadian Virtual War Memorial)
Morning Glory: Canada's own WWI war horse (CBC News)
Monday Monuments and Memorials – Lt Col George Harold Baker, MP and Morning Glory (Great War 100 Reads)

See also 
List of Bishop's College School alumni

Bishop's College School alumni
1877 births
1916 deaths
People from Cowansville
Anglophone Quebec people
McGill University alumni
Conservative Party of Canada (1867–1942) MPs
Members of the House of Commons of Canada from Quebec
Canadian Militia officers
6th Duke of Connaught's Royal Canadian Hussars
Canadian Expeditionary Force officers
Canadian military personnel killed in World War I
Canadian military personnel from Quebec